The 2000 Stella Artois Championships was a men's tennis tournament played on grass courts at the Queen's Club in London, United Kingdom and was part of the International Series of the 2000 ATP Tour. It was the 98th edition of the tournament and was held from 12 June until 19 June 2000. Sixth-seeded Lleyton Hewitt won the singles title.

Finals

Singles

 Lleyton Hewitt defeated  Pete Sampras 6–4, 6–4
 It was Hewitt's 4th title of the year and the 6th of his career.

Doubles

 Todd Woodbridge /  Mark Woodforde defeated  Jonathan Stark /  Eric Taino 6–7(5–7), 6–3, 7–6(7–1)
 It was Woodbridge's 6th title of the year and the 67th of his career. It was Woodforde's 6th title of the year and the 69th of his career.

References

External links
 Official website
 ATP tournament profile

 
Stella Artois Championships
Queen's Club Championships
Stella Artois Championships
Stella Artois Championships
Stella Artois Championships